Sive  is a play by the Irish writer John B. Keane, first performed in Listowel, County Kerry in 1959. Keane chose to use the name "Sive" for the play in honor of his sister, Shiela, using the Irish-Gaelic form of the name.

The play is set in rural Ireland where the set of attitudes about the battle between the generations (the young orphan Sive takes her own life rather than marrying an old fellow), poverty, exploitation, marriage, greed, and love are addressed.

Performance history
After being rejected by the Abbey Theatre, The Listowel Drama Group produced the play. Sive first performed in Christy's Ballroom, Listowel, Co. Kerry. The play was an overall success, but John B. Keane noted that some took offense to the melodramatic content of the play, calling it blasphemous and pornographic based on the appearance of Sive as a young girl.

In the first performances of the play, Nora Relihan played Mena Galvin, Margaret Dillon performed as Sive, and John B. Keane himself played Carthalawn.

The play is still widely known throughout Ireland, usually being a piece of theatre taught in Irish school systems.

References

External links
Abbey Theatre site

Plays set in Ireland
1959 plays
Irish plays